Kent Walton (22 August 1917 – 24 August 2003), born Kenneth Walton Beckett, was a British television sports commentator, presenter and actor.  He is best remembered as the predominant commentator on ITV's coverage of British professional wrestling from 1955 to 1988.

Early life 
Despite a transatlantic accent which led many to believe he was Canadian, he was born in Cairo, Egypt, the son of the finance minister in the colonial government. He grew up at Haslemere in Surrey and was educated at Charterhouse.

He attended the Embassy School of Acting in London and appeared in rep. On the outbreak of war in 1939, he joined the Royal Air Force, serving in Bomber Command as a radio operator and front gunner. He acquired his accent mixing with Canadian airmen.

Sports commentator
After the end of the war he returned to acting before commentating on tennis and football. He made his television wrestling commentary debut on the ITV network in November 1955, a job he kept for 33 years. At its peak in the 1970s, ITV's wrestling coverage, on World of Sport, could command up to 12 million between the football half-time and full-time results (4–4.40 pm) on Saturdays. Although fans of ITV's wrestling coverage reportedly included the Queen, the Duke of Edinburgh, the Queen Mother and Margaret Thatcher, enthusiasm was not shared by ITV's Head of Sport, Greg Dyke, and in 1988 he dropped the sport, a blow from which it never recovered.

Presenter 
Walton was a disc jockey on Radio Luxembourg, and for a time presented several tv music shows:- Honey Hit Parade, and then Cool for Cats from 1956 to 1961, then Discs A Gogo for TWW Television from 1961 to 1965. In the early sixties, he also acted as a judge on Thank Your Lucky Stars on ITV.

Producer
In the early 1970s, he was involved with British sexploitation movies and is credited as a producer of such films as Clinic Exclusive, aka Clinic Xclusive, aka With These Hands (1971). A co-founder of Pyramid Films, he jointly used a pseudonym, Elton Hawke, with his business partner Hazel Adair, the co creator of the soap opera Crossroads. He used other pseudonyms to keep this part of his life from gaining public attention, but it was revealed in a 1975 episode of the TV documentary series Man Alive.

Personal life 
Walton married Lynn Smith, the first wife of Leslie Grade in 1949; the couple had a son. He also had a stepson Michael (now Lord Grade) through his wife's first marriage.

Awards and accomplishments 
Wrestling Observer Newsletter
Wrestling Observer Newsletter Hall of Fame (Class of 2011)

References

External links 

Kent Walton obituary at The Daily Telegraph August 27, 2003
Kent Walton obituary at The Guardian September 8, 2003

1917 births
2003 deaths
Professional wrestling announcers
British television presenters
People educated at Charterhouse School